"Alingo" is a song by Nigerian duo P-Square. It appeared as a bonus track on their sixth studio album, Double Trouble (2014). It peaked at number one on MTV Base's Official Naija Top 10 Chart from March 22 through March 28, 2013, surpassing 2 Face Idibia's "Ihe Neme". It was originally leaked to the public. The duo recorded the song prior to the Love AfroBeats Festival, which occurred at the HMV Apollo in London.

The music video for "Alingo" won the Most Gifted African (West) Video and was nominated for Most Gifted Video of the Year at the 2013 Channel O Music Video Awards. Jude Engees Okoye won Best Music Video Director at the 2013 The Headies for "Alingo".

Music video
The music video was directed by Jude Engees Okoye and Clarence Peters.

Dance move and controversy
"Alingo" became popular due to its controversial dance moves. The duo first announced the Alingo dance in a press conference for the Love Afrobeats Festival. They said the pace of the dance makes it complicated for a lot of people. After uploading the music video for "Alingo" to YouTube, the duo received numerous criticism from people who felt the song's dance moves bear close resemblance to the Azonto dance. Puffy Tee, a music manager responsible for Olu Maintain's "Yahooze", VIP's "Away" and Becca's "No Away", extensively said, "the music industry is a vast one so everybody has the opportunity to create a new thing, so if Ghanaians introduce Azonto and P-Square from Nigeria also create Alingo, it's all in the best interest of the African music industry as a whole".

The Nigerian Broadcasting Corporation placed a ban on the music video, stating, "erotic dance scenes at the end of the musical video". When asked how they received the news of the ban, Peter Okoye said the ban actually helped promote the song and that it did not prevent cable networks from playing the record.

Accolades

Track listing

 Digital single

References

P-Square songs
2012 singles
2012 in Nigerian music
2012 songs